The Battle of Tres Forcas was a battle on 7 August 1856 between boat crews from the Prussian Navy corvette SMS Danzig (then on a foreign cruise, commanded by Prince Adalbert of Prussia) and the Berber Riffians. It occurred at Cape Tres Forcas in Morocco, and was one of the first examples of Prussian or German gunboat diplomacy.

The Treaty of Paris of 1856 had decided that a Prussian warship should be deployed to the River Danube's outlet into the Black Sea and, on its way there, Prince Adalbert decided to explore the Rif coast of Morocco. There, four years earlier, on 7 December 1852, the Prussian warship Flora had been shot at by pirates, with one sailor killed and its captain injured.

On 7 August 1856, Prince Adalbert manned two boats and deployed them along the coast. After the boats came under fire from the Riffians, Danzig moved to only 600 metres from the shore to give the boat crews supporting fire. Adalbert then ordered a landing operation by 14 officers and 53 non-commissioned officers, sailors, and marines, led by Adalbert in person. Around noon, he led a surprise attack on a steep rock face nearly 40 metres high under heavy enemy fire. This attack was successful and the Riffians were forced back to a plateau. However, they were also receiving continuous reinforcement, so Adalbert finally decided to withdraw, lest he and his troops become cut off from the shore.

Prussian casualties were seven dead and 22 wounded, including Adalbert, shot in the thigh. A subscription from the whole Prussian Navy raised a monument to the dead of the battle in Gibraltar in the form of an eagle, set up in 1863. Despite being a complete tactical failure, the landing and the courage of Adalbert and his sailors were praised for decades to come by the Prussian people and particularly within the Prussian and German Imperial navies.

References

External links
 Memorial Memorial plaque in Kiel

Tres Forcas
1856 in Morocco
1856 in Africa
Prussian Navy
Tres Forcas
Tres Forcas
19th century in Morocco
Tres Forcas